Victor Berglind (born October 2, 1992) is a Swedish professional ice hockey defenceman who currently plays for BIK Karlskoga of the HockeyAllsvenskan.

Berglind previously played in the Elitserien for Brynäs IF.

References

External links

1992 births
Living people
Arvika HC players
Brynäs IF players
Djurgårdens IF Hockey players
IK Oskarshamn players
Rögle BK players
Sportspeople from Karlstad
IF Sundsvall Hockey players
Swedish ice hockey defencemen